Gillian McCall is a former Irish woman cricketer. She has played for Ireland in 2 Women's ODIs. She has represented Irish women's cricket team at the 1990 Women's European Cricket Cup and in the 1991 Women's European Cricket Cup.

References 

Living people
Irish women cricketers
Ireland women One Day International cricketers
Year of birth missing (living people)